William H. Kienzle (March 12, 1862 – April 16, 1910) was a 19th-century Major League Baseball player. He played outfield for the 1882 Philadelphia Athletics in the American Association and the 1884 Philadelphia Keystones in the Union Association.

External links

1862 births
1910 deaths
19th-century baseball players
Baseball players from Philadelphia
Major League Baseball outfielders
Philadelphia Athletics (AA) players
Philadelphia Keystones players
Wilmington Quicksteps (minor league) players
Camden Merritts players
Trenton Trentonians players
Rochester Maroons players
Scranton Indians players
Denver (minor league baseball) players
Hastings Hustlers players
Galveston Giants players
New Orleans Pelicans (baseball) players
Houston Mud Cats players
Galveston Sand Crabs players
Wilmington Blue Hens players